The .38 S&W, also commonly known as .38 S&W Short (it is sometimes referred to as .38 S&W Short to differentiate it from .38 Long Colt and .38 Special), 9×20mmR, .38 Colt NP (New Police), or .38/200, is a revolver cartridge developed by Smith & Wesson in 1877. Versions of the cartridge were the standard revolver cartridges of the British military from 1922 to 1963. Though similar in name, it is not interchangeable with the later .38 Special due to a different case shape and slightly larger bullet diameter.

History

The round was first introduced in 1877 for use in the S&W .38 Single Action. As standard for the era, it featured heeled bullet with the same diameter of bullet and case neck equal to .38 inch; later versions discarded the feature and downsized the bullet, but the designation didn't change.

After World War I, the British military sought to replace pre-war revolvers with easier-to-handle weapons. Webley demonstrated a lighter version of their Mk III revolver with modified .38 S&W ammunition, firing a heavy  bullet. It received favorable reports, and the revolver was accepted in principle. 

As Webley had used the .38 S&W cartridge dimensions for their revolver, and the cartridge length was fixed by the size of the cylinder of the revolver (the same as for the wider .455), Kynoch produced a cartridge with the same dimensions as the .38 S&W but with 2.8 grains (0.18 g) of "Neonite" nitrocellulose powder and a 200 grain (13.0 g) bullet. In tests performed on cadavers and live animals, it was found that the lead bullet, being overly long and heavy for its calibre, become unstable after penetrating the target, somewhat increasing target effect. The relatively low velocity allowed all of the energy of the cartridge to be spent inside the human target, rather than the bullet passing through. This was deemed satisfactory and the design for the cartridge was accepted as the ".38/200 Cartridge, Revolver Mk I".

After a period of service, it was realized that the  soft lead bullet could arguably contravene the Hague Conventions, which outlawed the use of bullets designed so as to "expand or flatten easily in the human body". A new cartridge was therefore adopted as "Cartridge, Pistol, .380 Mk II" or ".380 Mk IIz", firing a 180 gr (11.7 g) full metal jacket bullet. The .38/200 Mk I loading was retained in service for marksmanship and training purposes. However, after the outbreak of war, supply exigencies and the need to order readily available and compatible ammunition, such as the .38 S&W Super Police, from U.S. sources forced British authorities to issue both the .38/200 Mk I and MkII/IIz cartridges interchangeably to forces deploying for combat.

The Cartridge S.A. Ball Revolver .380 inch Mark II and Cartridge S.A. Ball Revolver .380 inch Mark IIz cartridge were theoretically phased out of British service in 1963, when the 9×19mm semi-automatic Browning Hi-Power pistol was finally issued to most British and Commonwealth forces.

Variants
The .38 Colt New Police was Colt's Manufacturing Company's proprietary name for what was essentially the .38 S&W with a flat-nosed bullet.

MKE 9.65 mm Normal (9.2×23mmR (.38 Smith & Wesson)) cartridge has a  lead-antimony alloy bullet with a gilding-metal full metal jacket and a Boxer-primed brass case. The "normal" designation differentiates it from their 9.65mm Special (9.1×29mmR (.38 Special)) round. It uses the 9.65 mm (.38-caliber) nominal bore rather than its 9.2 mm (.361-caliber) actual bore.

Current status
The .380 Mk IIz is still produced by the Ordnance Factory Board in India, for use in revolvers. Commercially, only Ruger makes limited runs of revolvers in this caliber for overseas sales, and only a few companies still manufacture ammunition. Most of those that do so offer it in only a  lead round nose bullet, though Fiocchi still markets full metal jacket bullet rounds. Some companies, such as Buffalo Bore,  manufacture several different types of ammunition for self-defense and/or hunting.

See also
Colt Official Police Revolver
Colt Police Positive Revolver
Enfield No. 2 revolver
Smith & Wesson Model 10
Table of handgun and rifle cartridges
Webley revolver

References

External links 

Pistol and rifle cartridges
Rimmed cartridges
Smith & Wesson cartridges